Bacchisa medioviolacea is a species of beetle in the family Cerambycidae. It was described by Breuning in 1965. It is known from Laos.

References

M
Beetles described in 1965